Paran in Iran may refer to:
 Paran, East Azerbaijan (پرن - Paran), a village
 Paran, Isfahan (پاران - Pārān), a city
 Paran, Mazandaran (پرن - Paran), a village

See also
 Paran (disambiguation)